Max Tiri is a Papua New Guinean former professional rugby league footballer who represented Papua New Guinea at the 1995 World Cup.

Playing career
Tiri played for the Mt Hagen Eagles and represented Papua New Guinea between 1990 and 1996. He captained Papua New Guinea and finished his career having played in 32 tests.

Administration career
Tiri served as the Highlands region director and on the board of the Papua New Guinea Rugby Football League.

References

Living people
Papua New Guinean rugby league players
Papua New Guinean sportsmen
Papua New Guinea national rugby league team players
Rugby league second-rows
Papua New Guinean rugby league administrators
Date of birth missing (living people)
Place of birth missing (living people)
Hagen Eagles players
Year of birth missing (living people)